Kurt Kristoffer Anderson (born August 8, 1978) is an American football coach  and former player.  He is currently the offensive line coach with the Northwestern Wildcats. He is the former offensive line coach at the University of Arkansas.  Anderson played college football at the University of Michigan.  After his playing career, Anderson became a professional football coach.  He served as the assistant offensive line coach for the Buffalo Bills in the National Football League (NFL). In the 2015 season, Anderson took over head offensive line coaching duties for training camp and the first six weeks of the regular season for the suspended Aaron Kromer.

High school
Anderson attended Glenbrook South High School in Glenview, Illinois. He was a 1996 Parade All-American linebacker. He earned a full scholarship to The University of Michigan.

College career
Anderson was a two-year letterman on the offensive line (2000–2001) for the Wolverines and was the starting center. He received the Hugh R. Rader Jr. Memorial Award as the team's top offensive lineman and was selected All-Big Ten Conference by the conference coaches following the 2001 season. He was a member of the 1997 Michigan Wolverines football team that won the 1998 Rose Bowl, as well as a share of the 1997 national championship. He also played in the 1999 Citrus Bowl, the 2000 Orange Bowl, the 2001 Florida Citrus Bowl, and the 2002 Florida Citrus Bowls. He signed as an undrafted free agent with the Arizona Cardinals of the National Football League in 2002.

Coaching career
In 2005, Anderson was an assistant coach at Indiana State where he worked with the offensive tackles and tight ends.
In 2006, Anderson was a defensive quality control coach at The University of Michigan.
Anderson spent the 2007 season as a graduate assistant coach for the offensive line.  Anderson joined the Eastern Michigan staff on April 2, 2008 as tight ends coach before shifting to the offensive line and run game coordinator in 2009. In 2010, Eastern Michigan finished with 2,080 yards rushing. The Eagles' ground attack was extremely effective during the 2011 campaign, Eastern Michigan rushed for 2,620 yards and 16 touchdowns on 575 carries for the 14th-best ground attack in the nation. A record two-year combined total of 4,700 yards for Eastern Michigan.
On January 28, 2013, Anderson joined the Buffalo Bills staff as an offensive quality control coach. On January 26, 2015, it was announced that Anderson was retained and promoted to assistant offensive line coach, by newly named head coach Rex Ryan. In 2015, Anderson coached the Buffalo Bills offensive line that paved the way to 2,432 yards rushing, 152 yards rushing per game, 4.8 yards per attempt, and 19 rushing touchdowns; all marks were best in the NFL on the season.  On January 9, 2016 Anderson was introduced as the offensive line coach at the University of Arkansas by head coach Bret Bielema.  Anderson developed Frank Ragnow, All-American and 20th Overall draft pick in the 2017 NFL draft. Ragnow is the highest paid center in the NFL. Others NFL lineman developed at Arkansas, are Hjalte Froholdt and Dan Skipper.
In 2018, Anderson joined the Northwestern University Wildcats, winning the Big Ten West Championship in 2018 and 2020. He developed current Los Angeles Chargers Offensive Tackle Rashawn Slater, 2020 13th overall draft pick. Slater was a Pro Bowl performer as well as All- Pro in his rookie season.

Family
Anderson is married with five children, wife Jennifer and sons Hawken and Torin,daughter Dagny and twins Odin and Raina. His grandfather, Bob Nowaskey, played for the Chicago Bears of the NFL and the Baltimore Colts and Los Angeles Dons of the All-America Football Conference (AAFC). His father, Donald Anderson, played college football at Northwestern University and in the NFL with the New Orleans Saints. Kurt's older brother, Erick Anderson, is a fellow Michigan alumnus who won the Butkus Award in 1991 playing linebacker for the Wolverines and played in the NFL with the Kansas City Chiefs and the Washington Football Team. Another older brother, Lars, played football at Indiana University Bloomington.

References

External links
 Arkansas Razorbacks bio
 Buffalo Bills bio
 Eastern Michigan Eagles bio

1978 births
Living people
American football offensive linemen
Arkansas Razorbacks football coaches
Buffalo Bills coaches
Eastern Michigan Eagles football coaches
Indiana State Sycamores football coaches
Michigan Wolverines football coaches
Michigan Wolverines football players
People from Glenview, Illinois
Players of American football from Illinois
Sportspeople from Evanston, Illinois